The Liechtenstein national under-21 football team represents the under-21s of Liechtenstein in the UEFA U-21 Championship, and is controlled by the Liechtenstein Football Association, the governing body of football in Liechtenstein. On 5 October 2022, it was announced that this team would be dissolved for 2023 and 2024, and would return in time for the UEFA U21-Championship 2027 qualification campaign. This decision was made due to the fact that most of the higher quality players in this age category would end up playing for the senior team.

Overview
The Liechtenstein under-21s first attempted to qualify for the UEFA U-21 Championship in 2006, where they played a home-and-home against Northern Ireland, losing 1–8 on aggregate, thus being eliminated from qualifying.

The Liechtenstein under-21s lost their first 59 competitive fixtures, being outscored 232–17. They avoided defeat for the first time on 6 June 2019, beating Azerbaijan during qualifying for the 2021 UEFA European Under-21 Championship tournament.

UEFA U-21 Championship record

Current squad

Current squad
 The following players were called up for the 2023 UEFA European Under-21 Championship qualification matches.
 Match dates: 3 and 7 June 2022
 Opposition:  and 
 Caps and goals correct as of: 7 June 2022, after the match against 

|-
! colspan="9"  style="background:#b0d3fb; text-align:left;"|
|- style="background:#dfedfd;"

|-
! colspan="9"  style="background:#b0d3fb; text-align:left;"|
|- style="background:#dfedfd;"

|-
! colspan="9"  style="background:#b0d3fb; text-align:left;"|
|- style="background:#dfedfd;"

Recent call-ups
The following players have been selected in the last 12 months and are still eligible to represent.Notes:'''
  = Preliminary squad

See also 
Liechtenstein national football team

References

External links
Liechtenstein U-21 (uefa-com)

European national under-21 association football teams
under-21